Anomie & Bonhomie is the fourth album by the British group Scritti Politti, released in 1999. The album marks a sharp departure from their previous synthpop era and features contributions from rappers Mos Def and Me'Shell Ndegeocello.

Critical reception

Anomie & Bonhomie was generally well received by critics; however, opinions regarding the reinvention of Scritti Politti's sound through its mixture with contemporary genres and vocal styles such as grunge and hip-hop, respectively, were both praised and denounced by critics.

Allmusic said that of the contemporary "updates" that "rapper cameos, vague house beats, grunge guitars -- sound as if they're pasted over backing tracks from 1986. Not necessarily a bad thing, but disconcerting, since the heart of this album is squarely in Cupid & Psyche 85 territory." Ultimately they conclude: "Anomie & Bonhomie [...] remains faithful to the sophisti-pop aesthetic the band pioneered in the mid-'80s."

NME stated that Gartside successfully takes influences from contemporary genres such as grunge and hip-hop and "hammers" them into the Scritti aesthetic, concluding, "Gartside has returned with an album as glossy, eccentric and beguiling as he's ever made" 

The Independent was more critical, claiming that Anomie & Bonhomie has an "uneasy alliance between hard rock, hip-hop and ambient", that the album "comes waving a big sign announcing its sophistication, but, for all the care and polish taken in its execution, it lacks the easy, relaxed air that sustains the truly sophisticated."

Track listing
All tracks composed by Green Gartside, except where noted.
"Umm" (Gartside, Lee Majors) - 4:14
"Tinseltown to the Boogiedown" (Gartside, Majors, Mos Def) - 4:55
"First Goodbye" - 5:13
"Die Alone" - 4:23
"Mystic Handyman" - 3:46
"Smith 'n' Slappy" (Gartside, Mos Def) - 4:53
"Born To Be" - 3:53
"The World You Understand (Is Over + Over + Over)" - 3:13
"Here Come July" - 4:00
"Prince Among Men" (Gartside, Majors) - 4:07
"Brushed With Oil, Dusted With Powder" - 6:05

Personnel 
 Green Gartside – vocals, guitars, Ebow, vinylism (scratches), noises, music arrangements, vocal arrangements 
 Allen Cato – guitars 
 Wendy Melvoin – guitars
 David Dyson – bass 
 David Gamson – bass, vocal arrangements
 Vere Isaacs – bass
 Me'Shell NdegéOcello – bass, backing vocals (4, 8), rap (4, 8)
 Abe Laboriel Jr. – drums
 William "Juju" House – drums
 Steve Pigott – string arrangements
 Paul Riser – string arrangements
 Brent Fischer – string contractor 
 Patrick "Red Cloud" Mah – backing vocals
 Lee Major – backing vocals (1, 2, 10), rap (1, 2, 10)
 Mos Def – rap (2, 6)
 Jimahl – backing vocals (4), rap (4)

Production 

 David Gamson – producer, mixing (2, 4, 6, 9, 10)
 John Hopkins – recording 
 Rail Jon Rogut – recording 
 Tim Burrell – compiling engineer 
 Bob Power – mixing (1, 5, 8)
 Bob Brockman – mixing (3, 7, 11)
 Michael J. Ade – pre-production recording 
 Andy Houston – pre-production recording 
 Tom Coyne – mastering 
 Ted Jensen – mastering
 Lon Cohen – guitar technician 
 Bobby Schneck – guitar technician
 Ian Alexander – A&R coordinator 
 Mary Hogan – project coordinator
 Green Gartside – art direction, design 
 Paula Benson – art direction, design 
 Paul West – art direction, design 
 Mark Mattock – photography 
 Simon Hicks – management

Studios
 Recorded at The Townhouse (London, UK); Ocean Way Recording (Hollywood, California); Baby Monster Studios (New York City, New York).
 Mixed at The Enterprise (Burbank, California); Room With A View, Sony Music Studios and Battery Studios (New York City, New York).
 Mastered at Sterling Sound (New York City, New York).

References

Scritti Politti albums
1999 albums
Albums arranged by Paul Riser
Virgin Records albums
Hard rock albums by English artists
Hip hop albums by English artists
Grunge albums
Ambient albums by English artists